David Michael Metcalf (8 May 1933 – 25 October 2018) was a British academic and numismatist. He was the director of the Heberden Coin Room of the Ashmolean Museum, a fellow of Wolfson College and Professor of Numismatics at the University of Oxford. He held the degrees of MA, DPhil and DLitt from Oxford. He died in October 2018 at the age of 85.

Academic career
Metcalf's primary focus was on the early and high Middle Ages, Byzantine Empire, the Crusader states and the Balkans. He worked at the Heberden Coin Room of the Ashmolean Museum in Oxford from 1971 to 1999 and was the director of the Heberden Coin Room from 1982 to 1999. He was appointed as Professor of Numismatics at the University of Oxford in 1996 and retired in 1998; he was also a Fellow of Wolfson College, Oxford, from 1982 to 1998.

He served as president of the Royal Numismatic Society from 1994 to 1999 and led the editorial board of its journal The Numismatic Chronicle from 1974 to 1984.

Honours

 1983 - awarded the John Sanford Saltus Gold Medal by the British Numismatic Society 
 1987 - awarded the Medal of the Royal Numismatic Society
 1991 - awarded the Huntington Medal of the American Numismatic Society
 2008 - awarded the Meshorer Numismatic Prize of the Israel Museum
 2008 - awarded the Derek Allen Prize of the British Academy

Selected publications 

 The Coinage of South Germany in the Thirteenth Century (Spink, 1961).
 Coinage in the Balkans (Institute for Balkan Studies, 1965).
 (Co-authored with Julia M. Merrick and Lynette Kaye) Studies in the Composition of Early Medieval Coins (Corbitt & Hunter, 1968).
 The Origins of the Anastasian Currency Reforms (Adolf M. Hakkert, 1969).
 The Copper Coinage of Thessalonica under Justinian I (Verlag der Österreichischen Akademie der Wissenschaften, 1976).
 Coinage in South-Eastern Europe, 820–1396, 2nd ed. (Spink, 1979).
 (Co-authored with W. A. Oddy) Metallurgy in Numismatics (Royal Numismatic Society, 1980).
 Coinage of the Crusades and the Latin East in the Ashmolean Museum, Oxford (Royal Numismatic Society and Society for the Study of the Crusades and the Latin East, 1983).
 Thrymsas and Sceattas in the Ashmolean Museum, Oxford, 3 vols. (Royal Numismatic Society and Ashmolean Museum, 1993-4).
 The Silver Coinage of Cyprus, 1285–1382 (Cyprus Research Centre, 1996).
 An Atlas of Anglo-Saxon and Norman Coin Finds, 973–1086 (Royal Numismatic Society, 1998).
 The White Bezants and Deniers of Cyprus, 1192–1285 (Cyprus Research Centre, 1998).
 The Gros, Sixains, and Cartzias of Cyprus: 1382–1489 (Cyprus Research Centre, 2000).
 Byzantine Cyprus: 491–1191 (Cyprus Research Centre, 2009).

See also

 Ashmolean Museum

References

External links
 Obituary: Michael Metcalf (by Nick Mayhew), in The Guardian, 19 Nov 2018
Obituary: Michael Metcalf on Yorkshire Numismatic Society blog
 David Michael Metcalf on Worldcat
Works by David Michael Metcalf in the Digital Library Numis

1933 births
2018 deaths
Academics of the University of Oxford
British numismatists
Fellows of Wolfson College, Oxford
Presidents of the Royal Numismatic Society
People associated with the Ashmolean Museum